Stig Kleven (born 12 January 1967) is a Norwegian sport wrestler.

He was born in Notodden and represented the club IF Urædd. He competed at the 1988 Summer Olympics, where he placed 4th in Greco-Roman wrestling.
He placed sixth at the 1994 World Wrestling Championships.

References

External links
 

1967 births
Living people
People from Notodden
Olympic wrestlers of Norway
Wrestlers at the 1988 Summer Olympics
Norwegian male sport wrestlers
Sportspeople from Vestfold og Telemark
20th-century Norwegian people